Frederick Herbert Wagman (October 12, 1912 – November 30, 1994) was an American librarian and president of the American Library Association from 1963 to 1964. 

Wagman was born in Springfield, Massachusetts. He graduated from Amherst College in 1933 before attending Columbia University where he earned both master's and a doctorate degree in 1934 and 1942 respectively. While studying for his doctorate, he taught at the University of Minnesota. In 1945, Wagman joined the Library of Congress as Acting Director of Personnel and of Administrative Services. He served in several roles at the Library of Congress before leaving to be Director of the University of Michigan Library and a professor of Library Science in 1953. He retired from the university in 1982.

Wagman also served on the President's Commission on Obscenity and Pornography, a Commission that the United States Congress funded and was set up by President Lyndon B. Johnson to study pornography in 1969.

References

 

1912 births
1994 deaths
American librarians
Presidents of the American Library Association
University of Michigan faculty
Librarians at the Library of Congress